Everyman Espresso is a chain of coffeehouses in New York City.

Locations
The original location shares its space with the Classic Stage Company in Union Square. Another location is in SoHo.

Logo
Owner Penix has a tattoo which reads, I (picture of coffee cup) NY. Penix made a sign to advertise Everyman Espresso modeled after his tattoo. The Empire State Development Corporation represented by CMG Worldwide claimed that this was a trademark violation of their I (heart) NY graphic, asked for Everyman Espresso to remove the graphic, and requested a cut of all money made for violating their logo.

Reviews
Some reviews of the coffee at Everyman Espresso have been positive.

Owner Sam Penix is one of New York City's best known baristas. He is from Florida.

References

External links

Coffeehouses and cafés in the United States